Aziz Karimov is an Azerbaijani photographer. He was awarded Free Media Awards 2020 The Fritt Ord (organization)

Life and Work
He was born in 1987 Baku and graduated from Azerbaijan State University of Culture and Arts alumni. In 2013 Karimov worked for Associated Press, subsequently starting his career as a freelance photographer.

2019 he is a frequent contributor to Getty Images. 2013 Freedom House auctioned off photographs from more than 20 countries, including Azerbaijan, Bahrain, Belarus, China, Russia, South Sudan, and Syria. The images, taken by amateur and professional photographers, were chosen as finalists from among hundreds of submissions to Freedom House's second annual photo contest, Karimov covered the War in Donbas, and Nagorno-Karabakh conflict.

2014 he attended "INTERNATIONAL SUMMER PHOTOGRAPHY SCHOOL with Magnum Photos" 2017 Lecturer at Azerbaijan State Academy of Physical Education and Sport, sports photojournalism. 2019 Lecturer at Azerbaijan University of Languages – Photojournalism

2020 Karimov's photo is included in the 2020 annual report, Associated Press photographers captured a world in distress"

Awards
2013 Press Photographer of the Year award, Photographers Association of Azerbaijan

2015 Azeri journalists among the winners of EU-funded Media project

2020 Azerbaijani photographers win gold medals

2020 Aziz Karimov awarded the Free Media Awards 2020

References

External links
 Official Web site

 Fritt Ord-pris til nominerte av Helsingforskomiteen
 Photojournalist of Turan News Agency awarded a prestigious International Prize
 Interview about 2nd Karabakh War
 Events in Ukraine through the eyes of a photojournalist Aziz Karimov

Living people
Azerbaijani photographers
1987 births
Storytellers
People from Baku
Free Media Awards winners
Azerbaijan State University of Culture and Arts alumni